Ferber is a surname. Notable people with the surname include:

Albert Ferber (1911–1987), Swiss pianist
Brenda A. Ferber  (born 1969), American children's book author
Christine Ferber (born 1960), French pastry chef
Edna Ferber (1885–1968),  American novelist, author and playwright
Ferdinand Ferber (1862–1909), French Army captain who played an important role in the development of aeroplanes
Herbert Ferber (1906–1991),  American sculptor and painter
Markus Ferber (born 1965), German politician
Marianne Ferber (1923–2013), American feminist economist and author
Mauritius Ferber (1471–1537), bishop of Ermland
Mel Ferber (1922–2003),  Emmy-nominated TV director and producer
Nicolaus Ferber (1485–1534), German Franciscan and controversialist
Richard Ferber,  American physician, inventor of the Ferber method
Tzvi Hirsch Ferber (1879–1966), Rabbi

See also
Ferber IX or Antoinette III, an early experimental aircraft designed by Ferdinand Ferber
Ferber method or Ferberization, a technique invented by Dr. Richard Ferber to solve infant sleep problems 
New York v. Ferber, a United States Supreme Court decision
Faerber
Farber

German-language surnames